A Woman with a Child in a Pantry is an oil-on-canvas painting by the Dutch painter Pieter de Hooch, created c. 1658. It is part of the collection of the Rijksmuseum, in Amsterdam.

Description
This was the first painting by Hooch documented by Hofstede de Groot in 1910, who wrote:1. A YOUNG WOMAN AT A PANTRY-DOOR WITH A CHILD. Sm. 25; deG. 3. In a room floored with yellow tiles stands, to the left, a young woman, wearing a red jacket and a blue skirt. She has just come from the pantry, and smilingly hands a jug to a little girl. Both figures are seen in profile. Traces of a picture painted over by the artist himself are faintly visible on the wall above the woman's head. The small window of the pantry and a cask are seen through an open door on the left. Through an open door on the right is a sitting-room; in this room a cushioned chair, with a portrait on the wall above it, stands by the open window. "An excellent work of the master" (Sm.). 
Signed " P.D.H."; canvas, 27 inches by 23 inches.
A good early copy is in the possession of the Rt. Hon. Sir A. Hayter, 
London. Sales:
 P. van der Lip, in Amsterdam, June 14, 1712 (Hoet, i. 147), No. 26 (66 florins); the pendant sold at this sale is now in the collection of Albert von Oppenheim at Cologne (6). 
 Is. Walraven, in Amsterdam, October 14, 1765 (Terw. p. 504), No. 15 (450 florins, J. J. de Bruyn). 
 J. J. de Bruyn, in Amsterdam, September 12, 1798, No. 25 (2600 florins, de Vos). 
 P. de Smeth van Alphen, in Amsterdam, August i, 1810, No. 43 (3025 florins, Smit). 
 The widow A. M. Hogguer, née Ebeling, in Amsterdam, August 18, 1817 (4010 florins). 

Now in the Rijksmuseum at Amsterdam, No. 1248 in the 1903 catalogue (formerly numbered 682).

References

External links 
Moeder en kind in een interieur, ca. 1658 in the RKD

1658 paintings
Paintings in the collection of the Rijksmuseum
Paintings by Pieter de Hooch
Paintings of children